Emilia Aylmer Blake, also known as Emilia Aylmer Gowing, (1846–1905) was a British dramatist, novelist and poet.

Blake was born in Bath, Somerset, England, the daughter of a Dublin lawyer. She was educated in England and France. She became known for her recitations and her poetry written for recitation, including her dramatic poem about heroine Alice Ayres. In 1877, Blake married actor William Gowing.

Works
 France Discrowned and other poems, Chapman and Hall, London, (1874)
 The Jewel Reputation 
 My Only Love (1880)
 The Cithern Poems for Recitation (1886)
 An Unruly Spirit, V.F. White, London. (1890)
 Boadicea, a play in four acts, K. Paul, Trench, Trübner, London, (1899)

References

1846 births
1905 deaths
People from Bath, Somerset
English women dramatists and playwrights
English women novelists
English women poets
19th-century English poets
19th-century English novelists
19th-century English dramatists and playwrights
19th-century English women writers
19th-century English writers
19th-century British writers